Iron Ladies is a 2018 Taiwanese television series created and produced by SETTV. It stars Aviis Zhong, Ben Wu, Ada Pan, Zhu Zhi-Ying as the main cast. It was first broadcast on 10 January 2017 on SET Metro and airs every Friday night from 10pm to 11.30pm.

Cast

Main cast
Aviis Zhong as Zhou Kai Ting 
Lu Yi-en (盧以恩) as young Kai Ting
Ben Wu as Su Can/Ivan 
 as Ma Li Sha 
  as Wang Qing Qing
 as Gao Ze Shan 
 as Lin Dai Yu/David
 as Zhao Yuan An
Jaytherabbit as Fairly Godmother

Supporting cast
 as Su Li Yu Qin 
 as Cheng Shui Jing
 as Yin Rou Xin 
 as Gu Da Fei 
Joelle Lu as Xia Zi Qing
 as Xu Tai Heng 
 as Josh
 as Xiao Q  
 as Mai Mai

Cameo
Serena Fang as Zhang Yi Yi
Fu Lei as Zhou Zheng Wu
Bokeh Kosang as Li Zhi Cheng

Soundtrack
"Wonderful day" by Ben Wu
"Unachievable Future 到不了的以後" by Ben Wu
"Don't Scare On Darkness 別怕黑" by Chen Wei Ting
"The Best of Us 最好的我們" by Chen Wei Ting
"Shadow 影子" by Irene Luo
"Almost 自然凋謝" by Sun Sheng Xi

Broadcast

Ratings

References

External links
Iron Ladies Official Website
Iron Ladies on Facebook

Sanlih E-Television original programming
Eastern Television original programming
Taiwanese drama television series
2018 Taiwanese television series debuts
2018 Taiwanese television series endings
Taiwanese romance television series
Fashion-themed television series